Bryce Washington (born January 25, 1996) is an American professional basketball player for Hapoel Galil Elyon of the Israeli Basketball Premier League. He played college basketball for the University of Louisiana at Lafayette, where he earned a spot in the First-team All-Sun Belt Conference in 2018.

High school career
Washington attended St. Augustine in New Orleans, Louisiana, where he lettered in both basketball and baseball. With the basketball team, he averaged 15 points and 12 rebounds per game in his senior season, leaving high school as a two-time All-District 10-5A selection.

College career
Washington averaged 6.4 points, 5.2 rebounds, and 1.6 assists per game in his freshman season with Louisiana. In the first round of the CollegeInsider.com Tournament, he scored 25 points en route to an 83–68 win over Incarnate Word. He was named Louisiana Sports Writers Association Co-Freshman of the Year. As a sophomore, Washington averaged 8.8 points, 5.7 rebounds, and 1.4 assists per game. On March 3, 2016, he posted a double-double of 21 points and 10 rebounds in a 72–69 loss to Georgia State.

Washington averaged 13.6 points, 11.2 rebounds, 2.1 assists, and 1.2 steals per game in his junior campaign. On February 13, 2017, he recorded 25 points and 13 rebounds in an 87–61 win over South Alabama. He earned second-team All-Sun Belt honors, leading the conference in rebounds and field goal percentage. As a senior, Washington averaged 10.4 points, 10.5 rebounds, and 1.3 steals per game. On November 17, 2017, in a 115–82 win over Savannah State, he recorded 21 points, 15 rebounds, and 5 steals. In the game, he reached the 1,000-point mark of his college career. Through the season, Washington established himself as one of the top NCAA Division I player in rebounds and double-doubles. He earned first-team All-Sun Belt honors.

Professional career
On October 17, 2018, Washington signed with the St. John's Edge of the National Basketball League of Canada. In 16 games played for the Edge, he averaged a double-double of 12.1 points and 11.2 rebounds, to go with 2.5 assists and 1.5 steals per game.

On April 12, 2019, Washington signed with the Mackay Meteors of the Queensland Basketball League. On April 26, 2019, Washington recorded a career-high 33 points, shooting 13-of-16 from the field, along with 17 rebounds in an 83–87 loss to the Gold Coast Rollers. In 18 games played for the Meteors, he led the team in scoring (21.7) and rebounds (14.7) per game.

On August 2, 2019, Washington signed a two-year deal with Elitzur Netanya of the Israeli National League.

On September 9, 2021, Washington signed with Hapoel Galil Elyon of the Israeli Basketball Premier League. In 2021-22 he averaged 10.0 points, 6.0 rebounds, and 1.2 steals per game. He signed a contract extension with the team on January 24, 2022.

Personal life
In high school, Washington was a member of the National Honor Society and held a 3.96 grade point average (GPA) as a senior. While majoring in accounting at the University of Louisiana at Lafayette, held a 3.3 GPA during his junior year and was named to the Sun Belt Conference Academic Honor Roll. Washington likes swimming and admires swimmer Michael Phelps.

References

External links
Louisiana bio
Eurobasket profile
RealGM profile

1996 births
Living people
American expatriate basketball people in Australia
American expatriate basketball people in Canada
American expatriate basketball people in Israel
American men's basketball players
Basketball players from New Orleans
Elitzur Maccabi Netanya B.C. players
Hapoel Galil Elyon players
Louisiana Ragin' Cajuns men's basketball players
Power forwards (basketball)
St. John's Edge players